Mutambara is a village in Manicaland Province, Zimbabwe located 16 km west of Cashel. It is the administrative centre of the Mutambara communal land. It was established by the East Central Africa Mission and the name means "to sit in a relaxed position with the legs outstretched, free from danger"

Chimanimani District
Populated places in Manicaland Province